The Samuel Stacker House, near Dover, Tennessee, is a historic Greek Revival-style house built in 1856.  It was listed on the National Register of Historic Places in 1988.  The listing included five contributing buildings and one contributing object.

It includes a limestone, hipped roof-springhouse.

Log slave quarters, which had been moved and were in deteriorated condition, were deemed non-contributing.

References

National Register of Historic Places in Tennessee
Greek Revival architecture in Tennessee
Houses completed in 1856
Buildings and structures in Stewart County, Tennessee
Slave cabins and quarters in the United States
1856 establishments in Tennessee